Wayne John Levi (born February 22, 1952) is an American professional golfer.

Early life
Levi was born in Little Falls, New York and attended high school in Herkimer, New York. He enrolled at Oswego State University for two years and then the University of South Florida briefly, before turning professional in 1973.

Professional career
Levi went on to win 12 times on the PGA Tour. His career year was 1990, when he had four wins, finished second on the final money list and was the appointed PGA Tour Player of the Year. After winning the 1990 Canadian Open, Levi advanced to a career best 19th on the Official World Golf Ranking. After the 1990 season, Levi was placed 16th on the PGA Tour All-time-money-list.

He played on the winning U.S. 1991 Ryder Cup team at Kiawa Island, South Carolina. The same year he represented the U.S., together with Joey Sindelar, at the World Cup in Rome, Italy.

From 2002 he played on the Champions Tour where he won twice, in 2003 and 2004.

Professional wins (20)

PGA Tour wins (12)

PGA Tour playoff record (2–1)

Other wins (6)
This list may be incomplete
1973 New Hampshire Open, Tupper Lake Open
1974 Tupper Lake Open
1975 Tupper Lake Open, Manchester Open
1988 Chrysler Team Championship (with George Burns)

Champions Tour wins (2)

Playoff record
Japan Golf Tour playoff record (0–1)

Results in major championships

Note: Levi never played in The Open Championship.

WD = Withdrew
CUT = missed the half-way cut
"T" indicates a tie for a place

Summary

Most consecutive cuts made – 6 (1985 Masters – 1986 PGA)
Longest streak of top-10s – 0

Results in The Players Championship

CUT = missed the halfway cut
WD = withdrew
"T" indicates a tie for a place

U.S. national team appearances
Professional
Four Tours World Championship: 1990
Ryder Cup: 1991 (winners)
World Cup: 1991

See also 

 Spring 1977 PGA Tour Qualifying School graduates

References

External links

American male golfers
PGA Tour golfers
PGA Tour Champions golfers
Ryder Cup competitors for the United States
Golfers from New York (state)
Golfers from Florida
State University of New York at Oswego alumni
People from Little Falls, New York
People from Herkimer, New York
Sportspeople from Naples, Florida
People from Oneida County, New York
1952 births
Living people